The Society for Sex Therapy and Research (SSTAR, pronounced "star") is an international non-profit professional association.  It was founded in 1975 and its members "have clinical and/or research interests in human sexual concerns." It provides means for exchanging ideas among clinicians and scientists treating or studying human sexuality.  SSTAR provides annual professional meetings, clinical conferences, membership newsletters, and an e-mail listserv for members.  Notable members have included Stefani Goerlich, Peggy Kleinplatz, Sandra Leiblum, Marta Meana, Kenneth J. Zucker and William (Bill) Maurice

See also 

 List of sexology organizations

References

External links 

 Official website

Organizations established in 1975
Sexology organizations